The 2010 Divizia Națională is the premier Romanian rugby union competition, reserved for club teams. It started in March 2010 and it will end on October 2, 2010. The current champions are CSM Știința Baia Mare. The champions managed to defend their title by defeating Steaua București.

Teams

Table
{| class="wikitable" width="450px" style="float:left; font-size:95%; margin-left:15px;"
|colspan="2" style="text-align:center" bgcolor="#FFFFFF" cellpadding="0" cellspacing="0"|Key to colors
|-
| style="background: #3fff00;" |     
| Advances to play-off.
|-
| style="background: #ccccff;" |     
| Goes to play-out.
|}

Play-out
{| class="wikitable" width="450px" style="float:left; font-size:95%; margin-left:15px;"
|colspan="2" style="text-align:center" bgcolor="#FFFFFF" cellpadding="0" cellspacing="0"|Key to colors
|-
| style="background: #3fff00;" |     
| Promoted to 2011 SuperLeague.
|-
| style="background: #ccccff;" |     
| Relegated to 2011 Divizia A.
|}

Play-off
{| class="wikitable" width="450px" style="float:left; font-size:95%; margin-left:15px;"
|colspan="2" style="text-align:center" bgcolor="#FFFFFF" cellpadding="0" cellspacing="0"|Key to colors
|-
| style="background: #3fff00;" |     
| Advances to semifinals.
|}

 Semifinals

 Third place

 Final

External links
  Divizia Națională – Official website
 PlanetaOvala.ro – Romanian Rugby News

2010
2010 rugby union tournaments for clubs
 
 
2009–10 in European rugby union leagues
2010–11 in European rugby union leagues